Hoy was a brand used for Spanish-language newspapers in a number of American cities, among which were New York and Los Angeles. Before the brand was no longer used, it was owned by Patrick Soon-Shiong. 

On February 12, 2007, ImpreMedia announced its purchase of Hoy's New York edition. Hoy's Chicago and Los Angeles publications were not affected by the transaction. The New York Hoy was later merged into El Diario La Prensa. 

In 2018, Patrick Soon-Shiong purchased Hoy titles in Los Angeles and San Diego, as part of his purchase of the assets related to the Los Angeles Times and San Diego Union-Tribune. A year later, both were folded into the respective Spanish editions of the Times and Tribune. 

On November 12, 2019, Tribune Publishing announced that it would cease print and online publication of Hoy (Chicago) effective December 13.

References

External links
Official Hoy Los Ángeles website
Official Hoy San Diego (San Diego) website

Daily newspapers published in Greater Los Angeles
Spanish-language newspapers published in the United States
Newspapers published in San Diego
Spanish-language newspapers published in California
Hispanic and Latino American culture in Los Angeles
Hispanic and Latino American culture in Chicago
Mass media in Los Angeles County, California